Ponderia caledonica is a species of sea snail, a marine gastropod mollusk in the family Muricidae, the murex snails or rock snails.

Description
The length of the shell attains 15.1 mm.

Distribution
This marine species occurs off New Caledonia.

References

 Houart, R., 1988. Description of seven new species of Muricidae (Neagastropoda) from the south-western Pacific Ocean. Venus 47(3): 185-196
 Merle D., Garrigues B. & Pointier J.-P. (2011) Fossil and Recent Muricidae of the world. Part Muricinae. Hackenheim: Conchbooks. 648 pp.

Muricidae
Gastropods described in 1988